First Methodist Church is a historic church  in the Central neighborhood on the east side of Cleveland, Ohio.

Located on the southeast corner of E.30th Street and Euclid Avenue, the church was built in 1905 and added to the National Register of Historic Places in 1995. In 2010, The congregation left the Euclid Avenue building to merge with Epworth-Euclid United Methodist Church to form University Circle United Methodist Church in Epworth-Euclid UMC's University Circle building. Euclid Avenue Congregational Church, whose building in the Fairfax neighborhood was destroyed in a fire in 2010, occupied the former First Methodist building from 2010 until mid-2014 before moving to a permanent building in South Euclid, a suburb of Cleveland. The former First Methodist building is currently unused, and was put up for auction in 2018.

References

External links
 Official website

Churches on the National Register of Historic Places in Ohio
Gothic Revival church buildings in Ohio
Churches completed in 1905
20th-century Methodist church buildings in the United States
Methodist churches in Ohio
Churches in Cleveland
National Register of Historic Places in Cleveland, Ohio
Central, Cleveland
1905 establishments in Ohio